Mryasimovo (Meräsem) is a rural locality (a village) and the administrative centre of Uryush-Bittulinsky Selsoviet, Karaidelsky District, Bashkortostan, Russia. The population was 243 as of 2010. There are 12 streets.

Geography 
Mryasimovo is located 41 km southwest of Karaidel (the district's administrative centre) by road. Krasny Uryush is the nearest rural locality.

References 

Rural localities in Karaidelsky District